Governor Crane may refer to:

Arthur G. Crane (1877–1955), 20th Governor of Wyoming
Winthrop M. Crane (1853–1920), 40th Governor of Massachusetts